Superstar is a Nollywood movie produced and directed by US born Nigerian producer Toni Abulu, the CEO of Black Ivory Limited, an entertainment company with over 30 years experience in film making. The movie shows a story of a Nigerian artist (Tekno) who struggles in the Nigerian music industry. The film premiered on June 5, 2015 courtesy of Silverbird Distributions. The film features Nigerian young artist Tekno and Iyanya which make it there first time acting on a TV show.

Overview 
Tekno (as Modele or Dele) and his friend (his manager, Ovie) in the movie has dropped out from the university in order to pursue a music career. He has to undergo through a lot of obstacles starting from his family who do not agree on the idea of music career. Tekno came across an opportunity to present a mixtape to an American producer who is searching for young talents in Nigeria. Toyin Aimakhu was brought on in the movie as Tekno's mother and was her first time acting an English speaking role in a film.

Cast 
The main characters in the movie are:
Tekno (as Modele or Dele)
Ovie as Ushebebe
Toyin Aimakhu
Steph Nora Okere

References 

2015 films
Nigerian drama films